Edward Ensinger Beidleman (July 8, 1873 – April 9, 1929) was an American politician from Pennsylvania who served as a Republican member of the Pennsylvania House of Representatives for Dauphin County from 1905 to 1908, the Pennsylvania Senate for the 15th district from 1913 to 1918 and as the 12th lieutenant governor of Pennsylvania from 1919 to 1923.

Early life and education
Beidleman was born in Harrisburg, Pennsylvania to Thomas and Susan (Ensinger) Beidleman.  He attended the public schools, graduated from Harrisburg High School in 1892 and received a degree from the Keystone Business College.

He studied law under Samuel McCarrell and was accepted to the Dauphin County bar on January 28, 1898.

Business career
He worked as a labor foreman for Lochiel Iron Works from 1867 to 1889, as an assistant at the Lochiel Merchandise Company from 1889 to 1900 and as a lawyer for Beidleman & Hull.

Political career
He served as a member of the Pennsylvania House of Representatives for Dauphin County from 1905 to 1908.  He served as a member of the Pennsylvania State Senate from 1913 to 1919 including as President pro tempore from 1917 to 1918.  He was a delegate to the Republican National Convention from Pennsylvania in 1924.  He had an unsuccessful campaign for Governor of Pennsylvania in 1928.

He died on April 9, 1929 in Harrisburg of a heart attack and is interred at Harrisburg Cemetery.

References

External links
The Political Graveyard

1873 births
1929 deaths
19th-century American lawyers
20th-century American lawyers
20th-century American politicians
Burials at Harrisburg Cemetery
Lieutenant Governors of Pennsylvania
Republican Party members of the Pennsylvania House of Representatives
Pennsylvania lawyers
Republican Party Pennsylvania state senators
Politicians from Harrisburg, Pennsylvania
Presidents pro tempore of the Pennsylvania Senate